The William Wallace Statue was erected 1888 in Aberdeen, Scotland, and depicts Sir William Wallace. Sculpted by William Grant Stevenson, the statue is positioned opposite His Majesty's Theatre and across from Union Terrace Gardens.  "It was paid for with funds left for the purpose by John Steill of 38 Grange Road in Edinburgh, the son of James Steill sometime of Easter Baldowrie in Angus." It is a category B listed building.

The statue bears this inscription:
I tell you a truth, liberty is the best of all things, my son, never live under any slavish bond.

See also
List of places in Aberdeen
National Wallace Monument

References

External links
RCAHMS record of Aberdeen, Rosemount Viaduct, Wallace Statue
SCRAN image of William Wallace Statue
Wallace Conference, 2005 
Gazetteer for Scotland: "William Wallace Statue"

William Wallace
Outdoor sculptures in Scotland
1888 sculptures
Statues in Scotland
Monuments and memorials in Aberdeen
Listed sculptures in Scotland
Category B listed buildings in Aberdeen